Épouville is a commune in the Seine-Maritime department in the Normandy region in northern France.

Geography

Heraldry

Population

Places of interest
 The church of St. Denis, dating from the twelfth century.
 The sixteenth-century chateau Gray.
 The Coupeauville manorhouse.
 The watermills.
 The town hall.

See also
Communes of the Seine-Maritime department

References 

Communes of Seine-Maritime